Jang Hyun Deok (장현덕), known professionally as Jang Seung Jo is a South Korean actor, known for his roles in Money Flower (2017), Familiar Wife (2018) and Encounter (2018). In recent years, Jang also starred in several other dramas like Chocolate, The Good Detective and Snowdrop.

Personal life
It was confirmed in 2014 that Jang had been dating SM Entertainment's The Grace member, Lina for two years. They had been seeing each other since the musical Temptation of Wolves. They got married on November 22, 2014 in a private ceremony and welcomed their first child in September 2018.

Later, on September 28, 2021, the agency announced that Jang's wife is pregnant with her second child and is due in January 2022. On December 31, 2021, Jang's wife gave birth to their second child, a daughter.

Filmography

Film

Television series

Musical theatre

Theater play

Awards and nominations

References

 

Living people
21st-century South Korean male actors
South Korean male television actors
South Korean male film actors
South Korean male web series actors
1981 births